Cherry Hill is an unincorporated community in Cecil County, Maryland, United States. Cherry Hill is located at the intersection of Cherry Hill Road and Leeds Road/Elk Mills Road north of Elkton.

References

Unincorporated communities in Cecil County, Maryland
Unincorporated communities in Maryland